Samantha Scarlette (born February 8, 1990) is a soft grunge / alternative rock singer-songwriter, guitarist,  and former internet radio talk show host.

Early life
Scarlette was born in Saddle River, New Jersey and her family relocated to Paradise Valley, Arizona. As a teenager, Scarlette interviewed and photographed rock bands. She is half Nigerian. Scarlette attended college at the age of 16 for television & radio broadcasting / film direction.  As a teenager Scarlette was an avid skateboarder, but sustained a serious head injury at the age of 19.

Music 
Scarlette started writing songs in October 2010 that would later become her "Into The Darkness" EP.  In early February 2011, she entered the recording studio with former Scary Kids Scaring Kids drummer, Justin Salter.  Salter engineered the studio recorded portion of the EP, as well as played drum & bass on the tracks. Scarlette played guitar on all of the songs except for "Fallen Star" (played by Salter).  "Into The Darkness" was released on June 28, 2011. In September 2014, Scarlette released a lyric video for a song called "Iron Maiden".  A digital single for the song was released to iTunes on October 13, 2013. In February 2014, she released, "Fallen Star" a song from Into The Darkness EP, as a single.  A music video for the song was released on February 12, 2014, and the song was distributed as a free mp3 download on her website. She stated that she was going into the studio with a producer and would be releasing a new album later that year.

In March 2014, Scarlette began working with producer Hiili Hiilesmaa(HIM, 69 Eyes, Amorphis) and in July 2014 they recorded a new album titled "Violent Delights + Violent Ends" at Quad Studios in Times Square. Scarlette's vocal coach, Sarah Dash of Labelle, appears as a background vocalist on two of the tracks ("These Violent Delights" and "Epitaphs of Love").  An additional track ( "[death of a dream] Reprise: Farewell") was recorded in October 2014 at Quad Studios and features Matt Deis from CKY on guitar and piano. The first single from "Violent Delights + Violent Ends", "These Violent Delights" was released on iTunes on September 30, 2014, with a music video released a few weeks later. A music video for the second single "Epitaphs of Love" was released November 7.  The album "Violent Delights + Violent Ends" was released November 18, 2014. Scarlette released a music video for a third single "Forgiven Sins" in July 2015. Scarlette released "Gothic Queen", the final single from "Violent Delights + Violent Ends" January 18, 2016.

Scarlette stated in an interview in January 2016, that she is going to start recording an album. Scarlette announced that a new single would be released in June 2016. As of April 2018 Scarlette announced she had scrapped the 2016 project and is working on something new.

On March 17, 2018, Scarlette released a free album for an "experimental electronic project" under the band name EX0XE to SoundCloud. The album was titled "VOID". The intro & outré tracks were originally intended for her scrapped 2016 album.

Scarlette cites 1990s alternative artists such as The Smashing Pumpkins, Courtney Love and heavy metal band HIM, as major influences.

Music gear
Scarlette plays several guitars which include: a white Ernie Ball Music Man Silhouette Special Benji Madden Signature Edition, a black quilt top PRS Guitars Custom 24 SE, and a black OLP Coffin Case's guitar.   Scarlette also uses various Boss & Electro-Harmonix guitar pedals along with a Marshall solid state amplifier. Scarlette has posted photos on instagram stories using a microKORG XL.

Radio 
Scarlette has hosted paranormal internet radio shows since 2016. She has previously released two episodes as a podcast called "Area 666 Radio" as a collaboration with a friend in 2015.  She announced in April 2016 that she would be doing a new live format online radio show called "I Want To Believe with Samantha Scarlette". The first episode aired May 14, 2016, on Energy Rock Radio. That show lasted 10 episodes.

In October 2016, Scarlette started doing a weekly paranormal segment for Idobi Radio's Eddie, Jason, & Chris Show. Scarlette's segment ran for approximately 20 minutes during the shows second hour.  She had high-profile guests on the segment such as Stanton T. Friedman, Peter Janney, Jeff Belanger, Tony Ortega, Joe Biggs of Info Wars,  Stephen Pearcy of RATT, Steve Hodel (son of George Hodel), and more.

It was announced on air on the April 17, 2017, episode of The Eddie, Jason & Chris Show Samantha Scarlette would be leaving the EJC show to host her own weekly show called "Blackout with Samantha Scarlette & Eddie Barella" for Idobi Radio starting May 5, 2017.  As of December 1, 2017, Eddie Barella no-longer co-hosts Blackout; the show is now called "Blackout With Samantha Scarlette".  Blackout is a weekly late night talk show that features, high-profile guests specializing in areas of the paranormal, conspiracies, true crime, and other fringe topics.   In keeping with the theme from Scarlette's EJC show segment BLACKOUT has featured guests such as Church of Satan, former FBI agent John DeSouza, Whitley Strieber, MUFON director Jan Harzan, Former Manson Family member Dianne Lake, Steven M. Greer, among others.   Blackout also occasionally features interviews  alternative models and popular rock bands. The last episode of Blackout aired in November 2019.

Clothing lines & Skateboard Company 
Scarlette released a clothing line called "A Goth Clothing by Samantha Scarlette" in fall 2012, this line has since been discontinued. She launched a new clothing line, MK-ULTRA 90 in December 2015, MK-ULTRA 90 was dissolved in the fall of 2019.  The MK-ULTRA 90 instagram account has been replaced by Scarlette's new company Vapor Skateboards.   Scarlette launched Vapor Skateboard NYC on Halloween 2019.  The company sells street wear, vaporwave inspired skateboard decks, Grip tape and skateboard wheels, as well as having a team of sponsored semi-pro and amateur skaters. The website for Vapor Skateboards has a .xxx url, a domain extension usually reserved for adult content.

Personal life  
Scarlette referred to herself as a Libertarian and Agnostic, after being falsely accused of being a satanist on The Alex Jones Show. 

Scarlette is vehemently against hunting and campaigned against legislation to allow deer hunting on private property in her home town of Saddle River, New Jersey. 

Scarlette has referenced having been briefly engaged to controversial artist JJ Brine in 2017, the engagement appears to have been conceptual performance art. Scarlette was photographed for a 2017 V Magazine online spread for an article on Brine.  

Scarlette is known to currently reside in the Hudson Yards neighborhood of Manhattan.

Discography

EPs and albums
as Samantha Scarlette
 Into The Darkness EP & Demos(2011)
 Violent Delights + Violent Ends (2014)
TBA (2023)

as EX0XE
 VOID (2018 - only on soundcloud)

Singles and Music Videos 
 "The Demon" (2011)
 "Iron Maiden" (2013)
 "Fallen Star" (2014)
 "These Violent Delights" (2014)
 "Epitaphs of Love" (2014)
 "Forgiven Sins" (2015)
 "Gothic Queen" (2016)

Guest Appearances 
 "Femme Fatale (Velvet Underground cover)" JJ Brine featuring Samantha Scarlette (2019)

References

External links

1990 births
Living people
African-American feminists
Women post-grunge singers
Feminist musicians
American people of Nigerian descent
African-American rock singers
21st-century American singers
Singers from New Jersey
People from Saddle River, New Jersey
Guitarists from New Jersey
African-American guitarists
21st-century American women guitarists
21st-century American guitarists
21st-century American women singers
21st-century African-American women singers